Street of Shadows ( or ) is a 1937 French spy film directed by G. W. Pabst. An English-language version with exactly the same plot was filmed at the same time under the direction of Edmond T. Gréville, but with some changes in the cast. Dita Parlo remained as Mademoiselle Docteur, but Erich von Stroheim took over the part of the German spy chief. The English-language version was released in the United States under the title Under Secret Orders. It was shot at the Joinville Studios in Paris. The film's sets were designed by the art directors Robert Hubert and Serge Piménoff.

Cast
 Pierre Blanchar as Grégor Courdane
 Dita Parlo as Mademoiselle Docteur
 Pierre Fresnay as Le capitaine Georges Carrère
 Roger Karl as Le colonel Bourget
 Viviane Romance as Gaby
 Jean-Louis Barrault as Le client fou
 Marcel Lupovici as Alexandre
 Gaston Modot as Le patron du café
 Robert Manuel as Un invité au consulat
 Ernest Ferny as Le capitaine Louvier
 Georges Colin as Le major Jacquart
 Georges Péclet as Gregorieff
 Jacques Henley as Le consul des États-Unis
 Charles Dullin as Mathésius
 Louis Jouvet as Simonis

Cast notes:
 Edward Lexy appears in a small part.

See also
Other films about the spy known as "Mademoiselle Docteur" or "Fräulein Doktor":
 Stamboul Quest – 1934 American film starring Myrna Loy
 Mademoiselle Doctor (also known as Under Secret Orders) – 1937 English film directed by Edmond T. Gréville, an English version of Street of Shadows, shot at the same time, but with some cast changes.
 Fräulein Doktor – 1969 film, an Italian/Yugoslavian co-production

References

External links

1937 films
1937 drama films
1930s spy drama films
1930s French-language films
1937 multilingual films
French black-and-white films
Films directed by G. W. Pabst
French spy drama films
World War I spy films
French multilingual films
Pathé films
Films scored by Casimir Oberfeld
Films set in Thessaloniki
Films shot at Joinville Studios
1930s French films